Toomas Vilosius (born 5 May 1951) is an Estonian politician and a former Minister of Social Affairs of Estonia. He is currently the communications manager of Silja Line.

References

Government ministers of Estonia
Living people
1951 births
Recipients of the Order of the National Coat of Arms, 4th Class
20th-century Estonian politicians
21st-century Estonian politicians
Members of the Riigikogu, 1995–1999
Members of the Riigikogu, 1999–2003
Members of the Riigikogu, 2003–2007